Josef Ferstl Sr., known as Sepp Ferstl, (born 6 April 1954) is a retired German World Cup alpine ski racer who won the Hahnenkamm, the world's most prestigious downhill race, in consecutive years   He made his World Cup debut at the race in 1974 at age 19, and won a silver medal at the World Championships in 1978 in the combined.

Biography
Born in Traunstein, Bavaria, he competed for West Germany at the Winter Olympics in 1976 and 1980, and is the father of German alpine racer

World Cup results

Season standings

Points were only awarded for top ten finishes (see scoring system).

Race podiums
3 wins – (2 DH, 1 K)
6 podiums – (4 DH, 2 K); 24 top tens – (16 DH, 8 SG)

World championship results 

From 1948 through 1980, the Winter Olympics were also the World Championships for alpine skiing.
At the World Championships from 1954 through 1980, the combined was a "paper race" using the results of the three events (DH, GS, SL).

Olympic results

References

External links
 
 

1954 births
Living people
German male alpine skiers
Olympic alpine skiers of West Germany
Alpine skiers at the 1976 Winter Olympics
Alpine skiers at the 1980 Winter Olympics
FIS Alpine Ski World Cup champions
People from Traunstein (district)
Sportspeople from Upper Bavaria
20th-century German people